La Víspera (The Eve) is a 1982 Mexican political drama film, directed by Alejandro Pelayo. The film received four Ariel Awards in 1983: Best Actor (Ernesto Gómez Cruz), Best Supporting Actor (Alfredo Sevilla), Best Original Screenplay and Best First Feature Film. The film plot recount 24 hours before engineer Manuel Miranda (Ernesto Gómez Cruz) takes office as Secretary of State in Mexico.

Main cast
Ernesto Gómez Cruz and Ingeniero Manuel Miranda
María Rojo as Margarita
Alfredo Sevilla as Óscar Castelazo
Ignacio Retes as Rubén Rocha
Salvador Sánchez as Villegas
Ana Ofelia Murguía as Irma

Awards

Ariel Awards
The Ariel Awards are awarded annually by the Mexican Academy of Film Arts and Sciences in Mexico. In the 25th Ariel Awards, La Víspera received three awards out of five nominations.

External links

References

1982 films
1982 drama films
Mexican drama films
1980s Spanish-language films
1980s Mexican films